Alfred Street Baptist Church's is a Baptist church in Alexandria, Virginia, United States. It is affiliated with the National Baptist Convention, USA.

History

In 1806, the colored members of the church Alexandria Baptist Society established the Colored Baptist Society which would eventually become First African Baptist Church of Alexandria, Virginia. The church welcomed its first black pastor when Reverend Sampson White was called to lead the recently independent congregation. White had previously served as the founding pastor of Nineteenth Street Baptist Church of Washington, D.C. and Abyssinian Baptist Church of New York City. He would be followed by Reverend Samuel Madden in 1863.

Architectural improvements were implemented in the 1880s and in 1994, when a new sanctuary was built. The exterior of the building was preserved, but the interior was greatly improved. Alfred Street Baptist Church is located at 301 South Alfred Street in Alexandria, Virginia.

Beliefs 
The Church has a Baptist confession of faith and is a member of the National Baptist Convention, USA.

See also
 National Register of Historic Places listings in Alexandria, Virginia

References

External links

Official website
Information on the Alfred Street Baptist Church from Virginia African Heritage Program

Churches completed in 1818
19th-century Baptist churches in the United States
African-American history of Virginia
Baptist churches in Virginia
Churches in Alexandria, Virginia
Churches on the National Register of Historic Places in Virginia
National Register of Historic Places in Alexandria, Virginia
National Baptist Convention, USA churches